Abbas Hussein Rehema Al-Mutairi (born July 1, 1989) is an Iraqi footballer who plays as a midfielder for Al Shorta. He was called up for the Iraq national football team for the 2014 World Cup qualification. He is the younger brother of Ali Rehema the Iraq national team defender.

Honours

Country 
 2012 Arab Nations Cup Bronze medallist

External links
profile on goalzz.com

1989 births
Living people
Iraqi footballers
Association football midfielders
Najaf FC players
Al-Shorta SC players
Iraq international footballers